Pimenta haitiensis is a species of plant in the family Myrtaceae. It is endemic to the Dominican Republic.

References

haitiensis
Vulnerable plants
Endemic flora of the Dominican Republic
Taxonomy articles created by Polbot